Weidner Rock House is a historic home located near Hickory, Catawba County, North Carolina. It was built about 1799, and is a two-story, three bay, stone dwelling, with a one-story frame wing.  The house was moved to its present location and reconstructed in 1844.

It was listed on the National Register of Historic Places in 1973.

References

Hickory, North Carolina
Houses on the National Register of Historic Places in North Carolina
Houses completed in 1799
Houses in Catawba County, North Carolina
National Register of Historic Places in Catawba County, North Carolina